Frits Castricum (19 April 1947, Boxtel – 12 September 2011, Boxtel) was a Dutch journalist and Labour Party politician. He was a member of the House of Representatives of the Netherlands from 1977 to 1994, the European Parliament from 1994 to 1999 and the Senate of the Netherlands from 1999 to 2003.

References

1947 births
2011 deaths
People from Boxtel
Labour Party (Netherlands) politicians
Members of the House of Representatives (Netherlands)
Labour Party (Netherlands) MEPs
Members of the Senate (Netherlands)
Chairmen of the Labour Party (Netherlands)
Knights of the Order of the Netherlands Lion
Knights of the Order of Orange-Nassau
MEPs for the Netherlands 1994–1999